Kochel am See is a municipality and a town in the district of Bad Tölz-Wolfratshausen in Bavaria, on the shores of Kochelsee. The municipality consists of the districts Altjoch, Brunnenbach, Ort, Pessenbach, Pfisterberg, Walchensee and Ried.

People
Apart from its scenery, the settlement is known for the Smith of Kochel "Schmied von Kochel", who, according to legend, lead a Bavarian farmer rebellion against Austro-Hungarian occupiers at Sendling in the War of the Spanish Succession. Kochel is also known for its hydroelectric dam. It is a popular place for winter and summer holidays.

The expressionist painter Franz Marc lived and is buried in Kochel. His life and work is documented at the Franz Marc Museum in Kochel.

 Elisabeth Demleitner (born 1952), German luger
 Michael Mellinger (1929–2004), German actor
 Andrea Sawatzki (born 1963), German actress
 August von Finck Sr. (1898–1980), German entrepreneur

Transport
The municipality has a railway station, on the Kochelsee Railway.

Points of interest
 Walchensee Hydroelectric Power Station

References

External links
 Kochel Homepage

Bad Tölz-Wolfratshausen
Towns in Bavaria